Xena is a fictional character from Robert Tapert's Xena: Warrior Princess franchise. Co-created by Tapert and John Schulian, she first appeared in the 1995–1999 television series Hercules: The Legendary Journeys, before going on to appear in Xena: Warrior Princess TV show and subsequent comic book of the same name. The Warrior Princess has also appeared in the spin-off animated film The Battle for Mount Olympus, as well as numerous non-canon expanded universe material, such as books and video games. Xena was played by New Zealand actress Lucy Lawless.

Xena is the protagonist of the story, and the series depicts her on a quest to redeem herself from her dark past by using her formidable fighting skills to help people. Xena was raised as the daughter of Cyrene and Atrius in Amphipolis, though the episode "The Furies" raised the possibility that Ares might be Xena's biological father, but it is never pursued further. She had two brothers, the younger of whom is dead; she visits his grave to speak with him in "Sins of the Past". In Hercules: The Legendary Journeys, during her two first episodes, Xena was a villain, but in the third episode she appears in, she joins Hercules to defeat Darphus, who had taken her army. Aware that the character of Xena had been very successful with the public in the three Hercules: The Legendary Journeys episodes, the producers of the series decided to create a spin-off series based on her adventures. Later in Xena: Warrior Princess she is joined by Gabrielle, a small town bard. Together they go up against ruthless warlords and gods in the ancient mythological world.

The character Gabrielle, introduced in the first episode, becomes Xena's greatest ally, best friend, and soulmate. Gabrielle came from a small village in Greece called Potidaea. She craved to escape from the boring and dull village. She latched onto Xena in episode 1 as a way of leaving the village, to travel on adventures. Her initial naïveté for the first 3 seasons and her talkative nature helped to balance Xena's pessimistic mentality. While Xena's character to an extent alters subtly through the series, Gabrielle's character goes through substantial development and change especially in seasons 3 and 4. Through their friendship/relationship Xena recognizes the value of the "greater good" and the sacrifices that must be made to accomplish it (a central theme in the series in later seasons).

Creation and production

Xena was developed in 1995 by John Schulian as a secondary character for Hercules: The Legendary Journeys, although Lawless had already appeared as the character Lyla on the episode "As Darkness Falls", on 20 February 1995. Xena was originally conceived to die at the end of the third episode, "Unchained Heart", but when the studio decided they wanted to do a spin-off from Hercules, the producer Robert Tapert said that Xena was the best choice, since she was largely well received by television critics and fans and had a full story to be explored. The studio wanted to do something about Jason and the Argonauts, but Tapert said that show would have too much of the same feel as Hercules.

The original choice to play Xena was the British actress Vanessa Angel, but she fell ill and was unable to make it to the set. Ultimately the role was given to Lawless as she was already a resident of New Zealand. Lawless had several mishaps playing the character due to the stunts (some of which she performed herself), such as getting cut by swords, being struck in the head, and horse-related incidents. In 1996, while rehearsing a sketch for The Tonight Show with Jay Leno, she broke her hip when she was thrown clear from her horse. As a result, several episodes of season two had to be edited to accommodate her recovery, and some of them were changed so Lawless could have a very slight appearance, and the crew created some brand new episodes.

Bruce Campbell, Rose McIver, Hudson Leick, and Ted Raimi also portrayed Xena in various episodes of the series as a result of "body-swap" plotlines.

The name Xena derives from the ancient Greek  (xenos), meaning "stranger".

Appearances and development

Origins on Hercules
Xena originally appears as a villain in the Hercules episode "The Warrior Princess"; about ten years into her career of pillaging and marauding, Xena meets Hercules. Initially, she sets out to kill him. In "The Gauntlet", her army turns against her, believing that she has become weak after she stops her lieutenant, Darphus, from killing a child in a sacked village. Xena runs a gauntlet, and survives, becoming the only person ever to survive the gauntlet. She then fights Hercules, in the hope that she will regain her army if she can bring back his head. Xena seems to be getting the upper hand until Hercules' cousin intervenes, making no real difference himself but inadvertently giving Hercules his sword, which allows him to fight Xena on equal ground and defeat her. However, Hercules refuses to kill Xena, telling her, "Killing isn't the only way of proving you're a warrior". Touched and inspired by Hercules' integrity, and by the fact that he too suffered the loss of blood kin as she did and yet chooses to fight in honor of them, she decides to join him and defeat her old army.

In "Unchained Heart", Hercules tells Xena that there is goodness in her heart, and the two of them share a brief romantic relationship, before Xena decides to leave and start making amends for her past.

Fictional character history

Initial turn to evil
Several years prior to the series pilot, "Sins of the Past", Xena commits numerous horrible deeds from terrorism to piracy and murder, and at one point becomes known as the "Destroyer of Nations". Her journey down the path of evil arguably begins when her beloved brother is killed during an attack by the warlord Cortese. Xena vows revenge and she becomes estranged from her mother as a result.

Sometime later, she acts as the captain of a pirate ship, doing everything from raiding other ships to ransoming hostages. It is during one ransom attempt that she encounters the young, handsome and brash Roman nobleman named Julius Caesar. Caesar is an experienced warrior and military commander with grand ambitions. He and Xena have a passionate love affair and plan to join forces. Caesar, however, betrays Xena. Caesar has Xena beaten and then crucified (with her legs broken) on a beach to die of exposure—that is, until she is saved by an Egyptian slave girl named M'Lila. M'Lila had originally stowed away on Xena's ship and subsequently befriends her and teaches Xena her first pressure points. After saving Xena, M'Lila takes her to a healer who treats her injuries. While the healer is treating Xena, Roman soldiers burst in and try to kill Xena, but M'Lila shields Xena, takes a fatal shot from a crossbow and dies in Xena's arms.

This event drives Xena to the side of evil completely and despite her injuries she manages to kill the soldiers but warns the last one before he dies, "Tell Hades to prepare himself; a new Xena is born tonight."

First steps towards redemption
Afterward, Xena becomes the leader of an army and aligns herself with Borias whom she effectively seduces away from his family and the two join forces. The two become lovers and after a time, Xena becomes pregnant with her son Solan. It is during her pregnancy that a significant event happens. Xena travels with her Army to China where she hopes to build an alliance with the powerful Lao clan to facilitate her activities there.

Subsequent events that involve Borias betraying Xena lead to Xena running for her life and being hunted. While on the run, Xena meets Lao Ma, a woman who has great special abilities. She scares away the hounds chasing Xena with just a look and can move like a martial artist which awes Xena. Lao Ma cares for Xena as she never had been before by treating her as a friend who is only interested in helping her become a better person. Under her friend's guidance, she learns to put aside a great deal of her hatred and pain. Additionally, Lao Ma heals Xena's crippled legs and it is implied that she teaches Xena fighting moves she has not yet developed . Lao Ma gives Xena the metaphorical title "Warrior Princess", intending that she be a major catalyst for change in the land. In the end, Lao Ma's efforts come to nothing, at least in the short term. In the long run, however, Lao Ma's teachings are instrumental in shaping the good person she was to become.

Borias and Xena reconcile and renew their alliance, only to break it a final time and to split their forces between them, with Xena proving the stronger of the two. Borias is killed in the ensuing battle, and Xena gives the newborn Solan to the Centaurs to raise so that he will be kept safe and protected.

Encounter with Hercules and subsequent reform
Xena continues her life as a warlord for many years until she has a life-changing encounter with Hercules wherein she turns her back on the path of evil. She turns against her troops to protect a baby whose family would not pay the ransom she demanded. Her troops were going to kill Xena for becoming weak in their eyes. After these events, Xena travels with Hercules for a short time and the two share a brief romantic relationship. While their romance does not last long, the two form a special friendship. Each comes to respect the other's abilities and judgement. In a series 1 episode, each acknowledged the positive impact the other had on the world. In that installment, Xena said, "The world needs Hercules". To that, Hercules responded, "The world needs Xena, too". As the years progress, Xena and Hercules come to each other's aid at different times as well as acting as a source of comfort to the other. However, after first meeting Hercules, Xena finds the way to redemption to be more painful than she anticipated.

The meeting with Gabrielle
Haunted by her past transgressions, she is about to give up on her life as a warrior completely. In the episode "Sins of the Past". she strips off her armor and weapons and buries them in the dirt. She sees a group of village girls being attacked by a band of warriors. In the group is Gabrielle. Xena saves the young women and Gabrielle is left in awe of the Warrior Princess' abilities.

Gabrielle follows Xena in a quest to persuade Xena to let her be her traveling companion. During the episode, Xena returns to her home town, Amphipolis, where she eventually reconciles with her mother, Cyrene. She also visits the grave of her brother Lyceus to "speak" with him. When Xena privately confides with Lyceus that it is difficult to be alone, Gabrielle—who is silently standing in the doorway of the crypt—tells her, "You're not alone." Soon, Xena agrees to allow Gabrielle to travel with her. Over time, Gabrielle becomes Xena's dearest friend and soulmate.

Subsequent travels and hardships
Gabrielle and Xena become best friends, soulmates and indeed constant companions over the many adventures that follow. Each of the women learns from the other; Gabrielle becomes a warrior on behalf of good (not evil), while Xena develops a softer and more loving personality to balance her warrior's heart. Xena's subsequent life is marred by many tragedies. Her son Solan, who never came to know her as his mother, is killed by Hope, Gabrielle's demonic child, (with the help of Callisto); and Xena nearly loses Gabrielle more than once.

The instances where Xena and Gabrielle almost part ways tend to result from the outside manipulations of others. The most serious of these is, of course, the death of Xena's son at the hands of Gabrielle's demonic child, Hope. After this, Gabrielle, consumed with grief, journeys to stay with the Amazons. Xena, in turn, locates her and tries to take Gabrielle's life by throwing her over a cliff while she is in a weakened state. Xena fails in doing this, and subsequently, both women reconcile with the help of the spirit of Xena's son Solan. Specifically, Solan creates the land of Illusia wherein, through music, both women express their grief and anger, not so much with each other, but with the traumas they have each endured. It is here that Xena confesses that she did indeed kill Ming Tien because he turned evil and killed his mother Lao Ma. Xena admits to Solan that she is his mother and sings to him, asking forgiveness. After this, they travel together again.

Enemies

Soon after the start of her journeys with Gabrielle, Xena runs into Ares, who has evidently known her since her warlord days and he tries to seduce her into joining him as his Warrior Queen, efforts that she repeatedly thwarts. She also encounters a formidable warrior woman named Callisto, whose family was killed by Xena's army years ago.

The path to redemption continues
Marcus, a warrior, close friend and lover from her warlord days, whom she persuades to follow her in choosing good, is killed while doing his first good deed. Later, he is allowed to briefly return to the world of the living to help thwart a vicious killer who has escaped from the underworld. He and Xena spend a night together before Marcus has to return to the other side. Several years after her first meeting with Lao Ma, a messenger is sent by Lao Ma to ask Xena to travel to China to aid in stopping a great evil from taking hold. She sets out without delay to help her dear friend but insists that she must deal with this alone and that Gabrielle stay behind.

In spite of her best efforts, she is too late to save her mentor and friend Lao Ma from being tortured to death by her own son, the emperor Ming T'ien and is crushed with the loss. Finally, she and Gabrielle are crucified by the Romans on the Ides of March by Caesar, previously an ally and former lover of Xena's with whom she had planned to take over known civilization until he betrayed her. Caesar, himself, is betrayed and killed by Brutus. They are later revived by a mystic named Eli, a Jesus like figure, along with the spiritual aid of Callisto, who by that time had become an angel after being killed by Xena. This event would have long-lasting effects for all involved.

Eve/Livia
The event mentioned above leads to the birth of Xena's daughter, Eve. Callisto takes a prominent role in the events leading up to now. After Xena lets her die years ago she is sent to Tartarus but later she returns and becomes a god and an even greater enemy of Xena. Finally Xena attempts to save Callisto from her suffering by sacrificing herself. Callisto becomes an angel and Xena a devil or demon. Before Eve is born Callisto the angel, implants her soul in Xena's unborn baby with Xena's tacit acceptance, as a way to redeem herself from her past and her and her involvement in creating Callisto. Unfortunately, mother and daughter would have little time together, as the gods were bent on destroying the child to save themselves, as she is prophesied to bring about the Twilight of the Olympian gods and the birth of "Christianity". In order to save her child, as well as herself and Gabrielle, they fake their deaths, but their plan goes awry when Ares buries them in an ice cave, where they sleep for 25 years.

During that time, Eve is adopted by the Roman nobleman Octavius who provides for her every need and makes certain that she receives the best of everything. She grows up to become Livia, the Champion of Rome, and a ruthless persecutor of Eli's followers. In a sense she has become a reincarnation of Callisto and even name drops her. Eve's ruthless behavior may be due to the influence of Callisto's soul, but this is unclear, particularly since Callisto was purged of all the evil within her when she became an angel. After her return, Xena is able to turn Livia to repentance, and Livia takes back the name Eve and becomes the Messenger of Eli. like Xena did with Callisto before she tries to save Eve. After Eve's cleansing by baptism, Xena is granted the power to kill gods as long as her daughter lives. In a final confrontation, the Twilight comes to pass when Xena kills most of the gods to save her daughter, with the help of God and Archangel Michael, and is herself saved by Ares when he gives up his immortality to heal the badly injured and dying Eve and Gabrielle, with Xena later helping him regain his godhood.

Final redemption and death
Xena's quest for redemption ends when she sacrifices herself to kill the Japanese demon Yodoshi, which is holding the souls of the dead. Xena fights a Japanese army by herself and they kill her. Xena, now a spirit, fights and kills Yodoshi. Xena decides to stay dead so the souls of the 40,000 she (accidentally) killed years ago can be released into a state of peace. The series ends with Gabrielle on a ship, holding Xena's ashes, and speaking with Xena's spirit.

Legacy
According to the darshan, Naiyima, this is only one of many lives Xena will live throughout the ages. One such life is that of Arminestra, an Indian holy mother who leads a movement that preaches peace, and yet another is a woman named Melinda who, during World War II, uncovers the tomb of Ares and is possessed by the spirit of Xena to stop the God of War. In many of those lives, she will walk a path together with her soulmate, Gabrielle, furthering the cause of good against evil.

Skills and abilities
Xena has many skills that she acquired during her extensive travels to many parts of the ancient world over a period of many years. In particular, she has shown remarkable skill and prowess in hand-to-hand combat, displaying numerous acrobatic tricks and the ability to disable or otherwise kill multiple opponents at one time. She is also skilled in the use of pressure points – being able to cripple or even kill someone if she triggers the appropriate pressure point. Xena has an extensive knowledge of first aid and herbal remedies that rivals that of any professional healer.

Xena's signature weapon is the chakram, a razor-edged throwing weapon which she often uses for ranged combat. Xena can skillfully deflect the chakram off the surfaces it strikes, allowing her to hit multiple targets in one throw. She is usually able to deflect the chakram back towards her, allowing her to catch it. Besides being a formidable weapon, the chakram has other uses such as distracting enemies or quickly cutting distant targets such as ropes. After breaking in half, Xena reforged her chakram as a design-variation with diameter "handles", called the "Yin-Yang" chakram. These were utilized as daggers, could split in two mid-flight to strike multiple targets at diverging trajectories, and allowed for "boomerang" flight capabilities. Along with her sword and chakram, she has also shown great proficiency with other weapons such as batons, daggers, and whips. Throughout the series, Xena often utilized a signature war cry, "Alalaes". Her cry was an alternate pronunciation for "Alale" (or "Alala"), who in Greek mythology was the female personification of the war cry.

Xena is a formidable tactician, inspirational leader, and strategic thinker. She has the ability to analyze her enemy's tactics and effectively formulate a response. In responding to her enemies's attacks, she shows a great deal of creativity and ingenuity; at times, she has worked with little or no resources and limited time. Xena is well versed in military tactics such as forming a defensive perimeter, building defensive fortifications, organizing and leading troops, and cutting an enemy's supply lines. She also repeatedly demonstrates a talent for disguises, infiltration, and cryptography.

Although the majority of her skills are martial and mental, Xena does have some supernatural abilities. On three occasions, she used telekinesis and energy projection thanks to Lao Ma's teachings. Xena also once possessed the power to kill gods through her daughter, Eve. Outside of these specific powers, Xena knows the rudiments of most other forms of magic, enough that she can effectively battle or outwit magic-wielding opponents.

In other media
Xena has appeared in all of the series spin-offs, usually as the lead character. The animated movie Hercules and Xena: The Battle for Mount Olympus marks the first appearance of Xena outside of the television series. She also appears in the comics series Xena: Warrior Princess, originally released by Topp and Dark Horse Comics, and in 2007, Dynamite Entertainment acquired the rights to the book upon its discovery that the show still had many fans. This resulted in Dynamite Entertainment's spin-off comic book series Xena: Contest of the Pantheons and Dark Xena. This last takes place after the television series ended.

Xena is a playable character in the videogames Xena: Warrior Princess, and a selectable character in The Talisman of Fate. In 1999, Lucy Lawless also appeared in the animated television show The Simpsons dressed as her Xena character, during the Treehouse of Horror X. In the video game League of Legends the character Sivir has a skin titled, "Warrior Princess" that resembles Xena.

A statue of Xena made an appearance in the movie Doctor Strange in the Multiverse of Madness, confirmed by Sam Raimi as the director of the movie himself. However, the statue did not indicate any bigger relation to the Marvel Cinematic Universe and only served as a fun easter egg with no narrative subtext.

Reception and legacy

Lesbian subtext and debates
Xena has enjoyed a particular cult status in the lesbian community. Some of the lesbian fanbase see Xena and Gabrielle as a couple and have embraced them as role models and lesbian icons. A group called The Marching Xenas participated in many gay and lesbian pride parades.

A subject of much interest and debate among viewers is the question of whether Xena and Gabrielle are lovers. The issue is left deliberately ambiguous by the writers during most of the show. Jokes, innuendo, and other subtle evidence of a romantic relationship between Xena and Gabrielle are referred to as "lesbian subtext" or simply "subtext" by fans. The issue of the true nature of the Xena/Gabrielle relationship caused intense shipping debates in the fandom, which turned especially impassioned due to spillover from real-life debates about same-sex sexuality and gay rights.

In a 2003 interview with Lesbian News magazine, Lawless stated that after the series finale, she had come to believe that Xena and Gabrielle's relationship was "Gay. Definitely... There was always a 'Well, she might be or she might not be,' but when there was that drip of water passing between their lips in the very final scene, that cemented it for me. Now it wasn't just that Xena was bisexual and kinda liked her gal pal and they kind of fooled around sometimes, it was 'Nope, they're married, man.'"

The Xena fandom also popularized the term Altfic (from "alternative fiction") to refer to same-sex romantic fan fiction. Many fans felt the term slash fiction carried the connotation of being only about male/male couples and was not a good description for romantic fan fiction about Xena and Gabrielle.

She was ranked No. 3 in AfterEllen.com's Top 50 Favorite Female TV Characters.

Popular culture

Xena: Warrior Princess has been referred to as a pop cultural phenomenon, sex symbol, and feminist and lesbian/bisexual icon. The television series, which employed pop culture references as a frequent humorous device, has itself become a frequent pop culture reference in video games, comics and television shows, and has been frequently parodied and spoofed.

Xena has been credited by many, including Buffy the Vampire Slayer creator Joss Whedon, with blazing the trail for a new generation of female action heroes such as Buffy, Max of Dark Angel, Sydney Bristow of Alias, and Beatrix Kiddo a.k.a. the Bride in Quentin Tarantino's Kill Bill. The director Quentin Tarantino is also a fan of Xena. After serving as Lucy Lawless' stunt double on Xena, stunt woman Zoë E. Bell was recruited to be Uma Thurman's stunt double in Tarantino's Kill Bill. By helping to pave the way for female action heroes in television and film, "Xena" also strengthened the stunt woman profession.
David Eick, one of the co-developers of the Xena series, was also the executive producer of Battlestar Galactica, which also features strong female characters, and Lucy Lawless in a recurring role.

In 2005, the team that discovered the dwarf planet  nicknamed it "Xena" in honor of the TV character. On 1 October 2005, the team announced that  had a moon, which they had nicknamed "Gabrielle". The objects were officially named Eris and Dysnomia by the International Astronomical Union on 13 September 2006. Although the official names have legitimate roots in Greek mythology, "Dysnomia" is also a synonym to the word "anomia", which means "lawlessness" in Greek, perpetuating the link with Lucy Lawless.

In 2006, Lucy Lawless donated her personal Xena costume to the Museum of American History. In an interview the same year with Smithsonian magazine, she was asked the question "Was the Warrior Princess outfit comfortable?" and she responded:

In 2004, Xena was listed at number 100 in Bravo's 100 Greatest TV Characters.

See also
List of female action heroes and villains

References

External links
 Xena on IMDb
AUSXIP – Australian Xena Information Page

Female characters in television
Fictional ancient people
Fictional bisexual females
Fictional blade and dart throwers
Fictional female generals
Fictional female martial artists
Fictional female swordfighters
Fictional Greek people
Fictional LGBT characters in television
Fictional swordfighters in television
Fictional warlords
Fictional women soldiers and warriors
Female superheroes
Superheroes
Television characters introduced in 1995
Television superheroes
Xena: Warrior Princess characters